David Justus Huddleston (born 9 August 2000 in The Hague, Netherlands) is a Bulgarian gymnast.

He finished 5th at the 2020 European Men's Artistic Gymnastics Championships.
He qualified for the 2020 Olympic Games all-around.

Born in the Netherlands to a Bulgarian mother and an American father, he has spent time living in the Caribbean, the USA and Bulgaria. Huddlestone has mostly been a distance learner, though he was enrolled in a Bulgarian school between grades 3 and 7. He has an older sister, Veselina, who is a student of medicine as well as a younger brother, Matey, who is into marathon running.

References

External links 
FIG
 

Living people
2000 births
Gymnasts from The Hague
Bulgarian male artistic gymnasts
Bulgarian people of American descent
Gymnasts at the 2020 Summer Olympics
Olympic gymnasts of Bulgaria